A list of films produced in Pakistan in 1964 (see 1964 in film) and in the Urdu language:

1964

See also
 1964 in Pakistan

References

External links
 Search Pakistani film - IMDB.com

1964
Pakistani
Films